Marcus Marin (born 13 December 1966) is a German football coach and former player who works as player agent.

Career
Marin was born in Hamburg. He played 118 games and scored 33 goals in the Bundesliga.

Honours
 Bundesliga runner-up: 1993–94

References

Living people
1966 births
German footballers
Footballers from Hamburg
Association football forwards
Bundesliga players
2. Bundesliga players
Hamburger SV players
Hamburger SV II players
Stuttgarter Kickers players
1. FC Kaiserslautern players
FC St. Pauli players
FC Sion players
MSV Duisburg players
Fortuna Düsseldorf players
Holstein Kiel players
TuS Dassendorf players
German football managers